This is a list of scheduled destinations formerly served by Carpatair, a Romanian charter and former regional airline.

List

The destination list shows airports that are served by Carpatair (as of May 2014). The list includes the city and country name; the airport codes of the International Air Transport Association (IATA airport code) and the International Civil Aviation Organization (ICAO airport code); the airport name; additionally, there are labels for airports that are the airline's base and terminated stations.

References

Carpatair